KULT-LP (94.5 FM, "The Kult") is a college radio station broadcasting an alternative rock radio format. Licensed to Cedar Falls, Iowa, United States, the station serves the University of Northern Iowa area. The station is currently owned by the Board of Control For Student Broadcasting.

References

External links
 
 

ULT-LP
Cedar Falls, Iowa
ULT-LP
ULT-LP
Radio stations established in 2003
2003 establishments in Iowa